Olli Pajari (1 February 1860, in Rautjärvi – 20 August 1923) was a Finnish schoolteacher and politician. He was a Member of the Parliament of Finland from 1907 to 1908, representing the Finnish Party. Olli Pajari was the father of general Aaro Pajari.

References

1860 births
1923 deaths
People from Rautjärvi
People from Viipuri Province (Grand Duchy of Finland)
Finnish Party politicians
Members of the Parliament of Finland (1907–08)
19th-century Finnish educators
20th-century Finnish educators
Finnish schoolteachers